Tariq Rasheed (born 10 March 1978) is a Pakistani former cricketer. He played in twenty first-class and twenty-two List A matches between 1996 and 2004. He is now an umpire, and stood in the match between Federally Administered Tribal Areas and Habib Bank Limited in the 2017–18 Quaid-e-Azam Trophy on 26 September 2017.

References

External links
 

1978 births
Living people
Pakistani cricketers
Pakistani cricket umpires
Place of birth missing (living people)
Lahore cricketers